Nicolau Pereira de Campos Vergueiro, better known as Senator Vergueiro (20 December 1778 – 17 September 1859), was a Portuguese-born Brazilian coffee farmer and politician. He was a pioneer in the implementation of free workforce in Brazil by bringing the first European immigrants to work in the Ibicaba farm, which he owned. The contract was prepared by Vergueiro himself, establishing ownership of the production and other measures, mostly of an exploitive nature. Faced with this, the immigrants working in Vergueiro's main property, the Ibicaba farm, revolted under the guidance of Thomas Davatz, a Swiss immigrant and religious leader, who instigated the immigrant workers to grow their ambition to become small or medium-sized landowners, as they imagined they would be when they had left Europe.

Biography 
Vergueiro was born on 20 December 1778 in Vale da Porca, Portugal, to Luiz Bernardo Pereira Vergueiro and Clara Maria Borges Campos. He graduated with a degree in law from the University of Coimbra in 1801. The young man moved to Brazil in 1803 at the age of 25 and quickly entered the most important political and economic spheres in the province of São Paulo. On 2 August 1804 he married Maria Angelica de Vasconcellos, daughter of captain José de Andrade e Vasconcellos, in the Sé Cathedral. He worked as a lawyer at the São Paulo forum, a position he held until 1815.

In 1807 Vergueiro acquired, in partnership with his father-in-law, a two-league sesmaria in Piracicaba, where he founded the Engenho do Limoeiro, whose first administrator was his brother João Manuel Vergueiro. Seven years later, he acquired a new sesmaria in partnership with his father-in-law. With dimensions of three by one league. Monjolinho, as it was called, was located in Campos de Araraquara and was intended for cattle raising. Some time later, Vergueiro became the sole owner of the two lands.

In 1813 he was appointed councillor of the São Paulo City Council. He was a sesmarias judge until 1816, when he moved to Piracicaba, in partnership with brigadier Luís Antônio de Sousa, he acquired land in the region of Rio Claro. In 1821, on the eve of Brazil's independence, he became a member of the provisional government of the province of São Paulo. He held other positions in the provinces of São Paulo and Minas Gerais. Participating in the 1823 constituent assembly that drafted the first Brazilian constitution as a representative of the province of São Paulo, together with the brothers Antônio Carlos Ribeiro de Andrada, José Bonifácio de Andrada e Silva and Martim Francisco Ribeiro de Andrada, who was arrested after the dissolution of the assembly.

He was a senator and, with the abdication of emperor Pedro I on 7 April 1831, he was elected regent for the Provisional Triumviral Regency together with Francisco de Lima e Silva and José Joaquim Carneiro de Campos, as the emperor's heir, the young Pedro II, was only 5 years old and thus could not reign. He integrated the cabinet of 13 September 1832, assuming the office of Minister and Secretary of State of the Empire's Affairs until 23 May 1833 and that of the Treasury until 14 December 1832. He held the Justice minitry in the May 22 cabinet, organized by Manuel Alves Branco, second Viscount of Caravelas and, on an interim basis, that of the Empire.

He was a senator for ten consecutive terms. As a parliamentarian, he always defended liberal and anti-slavery positions. In the 1840s and 1850s, he pioneered the introduction of European immigrants to his coffee farms in Limeira and Angélica farm, named after Vergueiro's wife.

From 1847 onwards, Vergueiro encouraged immigration of European families to work on his coffee farm in Limeira. He paid for the immigrants' trip but, when they arrived in Brazil, they were in debt. The debt peonage system was adopted in which they worked for free in the coffee plantations. Their expenses accumulated and could be paid after the harvests, most of the time, however, the immigrants had to take out loans with exaggerated interest rates, generating a cycle of debts. In addition, they were compelled to buy their groceries from the farm's warehouses at high prices. These circumstances soon led to a regime of semi-slavery.

This led to the Ibicaba Revolt or the Revolt of the Partners, in 1856, which had international repercussions, to the point the Prussian government banned immigration to Brazil. With the failure of the peonage system, farmers began to pay a fixed amount for the immigrant's work, even a monthly salary. Wage labor was introduced in Brazil and African slavery began to deteriorate until it was legally abolished in 1888.

The book entitled Memórias de um colono no Brasil, written by the former Swiss colonist of the Ibicaba Farm, Thomas Davatz, exposed the terrible working conditions of immigrants on coffee plantations. From 1870 onwards, the Brazilian government began to finance the transport and initial accommodation of immigrants. At that time, societies protecting immigration were formed in order to encourage more European immigrants to come to the country.

Vergueiro died on 18 September 1859 in Rio de Janeiro. His body was buried in the São João Batista Cemetery.

References

Bibliography 
 

Regents of Brazil